The 2009 Oklahoma State Cowboys football team represented Oklahoma State University in the 2009 NCAA Division I FBS football season. The Cowboys, led by fifth-year head coach Mike Gundy, played their home games at Boone Pickens Stadium. The Cowboys finished the season 9–4, 6–2 in Big 12 play and lost the Cotton Bowl Classic, 21–7, against Ole Miss.

Schedule

Rankings

Game summaries

Colorado

Source: ESPN

Awards

Big 12 Offensive Lineman of the Year: Russell Okung
First Team All-American: Perrish Cox, Russell Okung
All-Big 12: Perrish Cox (1st team DB, 2nd team KR/PR), Russell Okung (1st), Keith Toston (1st), Bryant Ward (1st)

2009 team players in the NFL 

The following players were selected in the 2010 NFL Draft:

The following Cowboys were signed as undrafted free agents: 
Offensive lineman Brady Bond by the San Diego Chargers.
Offensive lineman Noah Franklin by the Carolina Panthers. 
Offensive lineman Andrew Lewis by the Kansas City Chiefs. 
Defensive tackle Swanson Miller by the Cleveland Browns.
Andrew Mitchell by the Cincinnati Bengals. 
Keith Toston by the St. Louis Rams.

References

Oklahoma State
Oklahoma State Cowboys football seasons
Oklahoma State Cowboys football